The Matt Costa EP is singer/songwriter Matt Costa's first EP and was released by Venerable Media. The songs "Astair" and "Shimmering Fields" were later re-released on Matt Costa's debut album Songs We Sing in 2005.

Track listing 
"Astair" - 2:57
"Acting Like a Fool" - 3:03
"TV Gods" - 2:55
"Shimmering Fields" - 2:19
"Movin' On" - 2:44

2003 EPs
Matt Costa albums